Ousmane Cardinal N'Diaye (born 19 August 1991) is a Senegalese professional footballer who plays as a defender for I-League club Mohammedan.

Career

Club
On 1 March 2021, N'Diaye signed for FC Kaisar.

Mohammedan
In June 2021, N'Diaye moved to India and signed with I-League club Mohammedan. On 16 August, he made his debut against Goa in the Durand Cup, which ended in a 3–1 comeback win. Eleven days later, he scored his first goal for the club against Indian Air Force, in a 2–0 win.

Career statistics

Club

Honours
Mohammedan Sporting
CFL Premier Division A: 2022

References

External links
Ousmane N'Diaye profile at foot-national.com

1991 births
Living people
Footballers from Dakar
Senegalese footballers
Senegalese expatriate footballers
Association football defenders
AC Arlésien players
Samsunspor footballers
Gençlerbirliği S.K. footballers
Ankaraspor footballers
FC Sheriff Tiraspol players
FC Kaisar players
Ligue 2 players
TFF First League players
Süper Lig players
Mohammedan SC (Kolkata) players
Championnat National 2 players
Championnat National 3 players
Moldovan Super Liga players
Kazakhstan Premier League players
Senegalese expatriate sportspeople in France
Senegalese expatriate sportspeople in Turkey
Senegalese expatriate sportspeople in Kazakhstan
Expatriate footballers in France
Expatriate footballers in Turkey
Expatriate footballers in Moldova
Expatriate footballers in Kazakhstan
Senegalese expatriate sportspeople in Moldova